Sawston Village College is an academy school in Sawston, Cambridgeshire, England. It was previously the first community college in the country and the first Village College. It was founded in 1930 and realised the vision of Henry Morris, then Chief Education Officer for Cambridgeshire.

In 1924, Henry Morris wrote a ‘Memorandum on the Provision of Education and Social Facilities for the Countryside, with Special Reference to Cambridgeshire’. In his memorandum, Morris avowed that:
 the village college would be ‘the community centre of the neighbourhood’;
 ‘it would not only be the training ground for the art of living, but the place in which life is lived’;
 ‘the village college could lie athwart the daily lives of the community it served; and in it the conditions would be realised under which education would not be an escape from reality, but an enrichment and transformation of it.’

Morris's vision of a school indivisible from its community still holds true today at Sawston, his first village college. Its 1060 pupils aged 11 – 16 share the campus with adults who come to the college for a range of purposes, educational, social, leisure and sporting. The college has a partnership for community education and the arts: the Broadening Education Partnership, and a community sports centre that has 900 members.

The college also has the only youth-led cinema in the country. Its pupils take responsibility for the function of the cinema – front of house, projection, business planning, for example – offering regular screenings to the local community.

On 1 June 2011, Sawston Village College gained academy status, effectively ending Cambridgeshire County Council's control and funding of the school.

On 6 September 2012, 14:15 BST, one wing of the original college building was devastated by a fire. The Walnut gallery (a community meeting room), Main Staff Room, Sawston Public Library were destroyed, and the Henry Morris Hall (the assembly area) was flooded from the hosepipes. The staff evacuated the pupils. Everyone was accounted for, and there were no casualties. The incident is thought to have been an act of arson.

Feeder schools
Children from the following schools generally start attending Sawston Village College at age 11:
Bellbird Primary School, Sawston
Icknield Primary School, Sawston
Babraham CofE Primary School
William Westley Primary School, Whittlesford
Duxford Primary School
Stapleford Primary School
Great and Little Shelford Primary School
Fawcett Primary School

Destinations
Students continuing in Further Education beyond 16 generally attend one of the following:
Cambridge Regional College;
Hills Road Sixth Form College;
Impington Village College;
Long Road Sixth Form College;
Netherhall School;
Saffron Walden County High School.

References

External links
The School's Official Website
The School's Community Sports Centre Official Website
2008 OFSTED Report
Sawston Cinema Website

Academies in Cambridgeshire
Secondary schools in Cambridgeshire
Educational institutions established in 1930
1930 establishments in England
Village College